Framverran is a village in the municipality of Inderøy in Trøndelag county, Norway. The village sits along the Beitstadfjorden, southeast of the mouth of the Verrasundet and northwest of the mouth of the Skarnsund.

Historically, Framverran was part of Ytterøy municipality before 1867, then it was part of Mosvik og Verran municipality from 1867 until 1901, it was then part of Verran municipality from 1901 to 1967, it was part of Mosvik municipality from 1968 to 2012, and since 2012, it has been a part of Inderøy municipality.

Framverran is the location of Vestvik Church.  From 1993 to 2010, Framverran School had been educating all of the 1st to 4th-grade pupils for the whole Mosvik area.  Petter Northug is from Framverran.

References

Villages in Trøndelag
Mosvik
Inderøy